Abner Wimberly (May 4, 1926 – September 18, 1976) was an American football player who played three seasons for the Green Bay Packers of the National Football League (NFL). He also played one season in the All-America Football Conference (AAFC) with the Los Angeles Dons. He played college football at Louisiana State University. He was inducted into the LSU Athletics Hall of Fame in 1949. 

Wimberly died on September 18, 1976, in Oak Ridge, Louisiana, from injuries he received in the crash of a private Piper aircraft.  He and four other men from Oak Ridge were returning from Baton Rouge where they had attended the LSU – Oregon State football game. Upon attempting to land in heavy fog around midnight, the plane crashed and four men died.  There was one survivor. Prior to his death, Abner owned a successful wholesale oil products distribution company in Oak Ridge.

References

1926 births
1976 deaths
People from Morehouse Parish, Louisiana
Players of American football from Louisiana
American football defensive ends
American football ends
LSU Tigers football players
Green Bay Packers players
Los Angeles Dons players
Western Conference Pro Bowl players
Coaches of American football from Louisiana
LSU Tigers football coaches
Accidental deaths in Louisiana
Victims of aviation accidents or incidents in the United States
Victims of aviation accidents or incidents in 1976